Elijah Adekugbe (born 26 April 1996) is a professional soccer player who currently plays for York United in the Canadian Premier League.

Early life
Adekugbe was born in London, England,|work=Movement by NM and grew up in Manchester. In 2000, Adekugbe joined the Manchester City Academy, where he played until 2004. In 2004, he moved to Calgary, Canada with his family and joined the Calgary Foothills SC. As the U12 level, Adekugbe represented Western Canada at the Danone Nations Cup and also played for the Alberta provincial team from U13 to U15 level. In September 2011, he joined the Vancouver Whitecaps Academy. Two years later, he returned to the Calgary Foothills at U16 level.

University career
Adekugbe received a soccer scholarship with Trinity Western University, playing for the men's soccer team from 2014 to 2016. He scored his first goal on September 6, 2014 against the Victoria Vikes. On October 3, 2015, he scored a late second half free kick to salvage a 1-1 draw against the UBC Okanagan Heat. On August 27, 2016, he scored two goals against the UNBC Timberwolves. After the 2016 season, he was named a Canada West First Team All-Star.

Club career
In 2015, Adekugbe began playing his former youth club Calgary Foothills FC in the Premier Development League. In 2015, he was the team's Golden Boot and MVP winner, as well as the Supporters MVP. In 2016, he served as vice-captain of the team. In June 2016, he was named to the PDL Top 50 Prospects list. He missed the entire 2017 season, after suffering an Achilles tendon injury during pre-season. In 2018, he was named to the PDL All-Western Conference Team and won the PDL title with the club.

In December 2018, Adekugbe signed a professional contract with Cavalry FC of the Canadian Premier League, ahead of the 2019 season. He was named vice-captain of the team in his first season. He made his debut in the team's inaugural match on May 4, 2019 against York9 FC. He scored his first professional goal on October 5, 2019 in a 2-0 win over the HFX Wanderers. He helped the club reach the CPL final, but missed both legs of the final due to injury. He was named to the CPL Fan Awards Team of the Year in 2019. After the season, it was announced he would be returning for the 2020 season. In November 2020, he re-signed with the club. In April 2021, during pre-season, he tore his Achilles tendon, requiring him to undergo surgery and to miss the entire 2021 season. On May 21, 2022, he scored a stoppage time winning goal over Valour FC in a 2-1 victory. After the 2022 season, he departed the club.

In December 2022, Adekugbe joined York United for the 2023 season.

Personal
He is the brother of Canada national team player Sam Adekugbe. Adekugbe has also launched a music career, releasing his first EP in 2021, which included a song called "Dream Team" which referenced his club team Cavalry FC and teammates.

Career statistics

Honours
Calgary Foothills
PDL Championship: 2018

Individual
PDL All-Western Conference Team: 2018

References

External links

1996 births
Living people
Association football midfielders
Canadian soccer players
English footballers
Soccer players from Calgary
Footballers from Greater London
Footballers from Manchester
Canadian sportspeople of Nigerian descent
English people of Nigerian descent
British emigrants to Canada
Naturalized citizens of Canada
Trinity Western Spartans soccer players
Calgary Foothills FC players
Cavalry FC players
USL League Two players
Canadian Premier League players
Black British sportsmen
York United FC players